The North Seberang Perai District (abbreviated: "SPU") is an administrative district on the mainland part of Penang State, Malaysia. It covers an area of 267 square kilometres, and had a population of 286,323 at the 2010 Census. The district is bordered by Muda River in the north which separates Kuala Muda district in Kedah, Kedah state border in the east which separates Kulim district, Perai River in the south which separates Central Seberang Perai and North Channel which separates Penang Island. The district capital is Kepala Batas, and the largest town is Butterworth. Other localities that are located in North Seberang Perai include Penaga, Pinang Tunggal, Bertam, Tasek Gelugor, Teluk Air Tawar and Mak Mandin. It is one of the three administrative districts in the Seberang Perai region, the mainland portion of Penang State. Paddy is largely cultivated in North Seberang Perai as most parts of it is covered by paddy fields.

Administrative divisions

SPU District is divided into 15 mukims and also consist of 2 towns which are Butterworth
and Kepala Batas.

Demographics

The following is based on Department of Statistics Malaysia 2020 census.

Federal Parliament and State Assembly Seats

List of North Seberang Perai district representatives in the Federal Parliament (Dewan Rakyat) 

List of North Seberang Perai district representatives in the State Legislative Assembly of Penang

See also

 Districts of Malaysia

References